Aphanisticus cochinchinae is a species of metallic wood-boring beetle in the family Buprestidae. It is found in Southern Asia.

Subspecies
These two subspecies belong to the species Aphanisticus cochinchinae:
 Aphanisticus cochinchinae cochinchinae Obenberger, 1924
 Aphanisticus cochinchinae seminulum Obenberger, 1929

References

Further reading

 
 
 
 

Buprestidae
Articles created by Qbugbot
Beetles described in 1924